The 2012 National Lacrosse League season, the 26th in the history of the NLL, began on January 8, 2012 and ended with the Championship game on May 19, 2012. The Rochester Knighthawks won their third NLL Championship, and first-ever in Rochester, defeating the Edmonton Rush 9-6 in the final game.

Mid-way through the off-season, the Boston Blazers announced that they would not be participating in the 2012 season due to problems in securing a facility in which to play. A dispersal draft was held and Dan Dawson, for the third time in his career, was the first overall pick, heading to the Philadelphia Wings. Kyle Rubisch was taken second by the Edmonton Rush, and the Minnesota Swarm chose Anthony Cosmo and Josh Sanderson with the third and fourth picks. The Swarm immediately traded Sanderson to the Toronto Rock. Casey Powell, after a knee injury in the MLL Championship game, wasn't chosen until the second round when the Rochester Knighthawks took a chance. Powell did not play in 2012 at all.

Both defending division champions got off to rough starts in 2012, as the Toronto Rock lost their first two and the Washington Stealth lost their first three. The Rock recovered and won their next three, eventually finishing atop the East division, but the Stealth had their worst season in franchise history, finishing 4-12 and the only team out of the playoffs. The Buffalo Bandits won their first two games but then went on a franchise-record six-game losing streak, during which head coach and GM Darris Kilgour called the team "stupid" and "pathetic", and said "I totally question the hearts of basically everybody but about four guys on our team". The Bandits won three of their last four games to finish in fourth place in the East and getting a first-round playoff game against the Toronto Rock.

The Colorado Mammoth only won 5 games in 2011 but in 2012, they had surpassed that total before losing a game. The Mammoth began the year winning 6 in a row and finished with an 11-5 record, good for second in the west behind the 12-5 Calgary Roughnecks. Despite having a league-high 12 rookies playing on the roster, the Minnesota Swarm surprised many finishing third with a 9-7 record.

The 2012 season will be known as a record-breaking year in the NLL. John Grant, Jr. was named league MVP for the second time in his career after scoring 116 points, breaking John Tavares' eleven-year-old single-season scoring record. Grant also scored his 500th career goal and 1000th career point during the season. Toronto Rock forward Garrett Billings finished only two points back of Grant but amassed 82 assists, breaking the old record of 74.

Team movement
The Boston Blazers announced in September 2011 that they would not participate in the 2012 season. A dispersal draft was held on September 9, 2011, as the Philadelphia Wings took Blazers captain and top scorer Dan Dawson first overall.

Final standings

Playoffs

Milestones and events

Pre-season
 September 1, 2011: The Boston Blazers announced that they would not be participating in the 2012 season.
 September 23, 2011: The NLL announced that there would be several rule changes for the 2012 season. The major changes were:
 For major penalties, the team will be short-handed for five minutes or if the opposing team scores three (rather than two) goals.
 When a team gains possession of the ball in their own end, they now have eight seconds (rather than ten) to get the ball over centre.
 When the whistle is blown to indicate a loss of possession, the player with the ball must immediately put it on the floor. Throwing it or rolling it away is now a penalty.
 Goaltender pads will be one inch narrower.
 October 26, 2011: The playoff format has changed for the 2012 season. Eight teams will still make the playoffs, four from each division, and the single-game elimination format is retained. However, if the fifth-place team in the West Division has a better record than the fourth-place team in the East, the West division team will take its place. This "crossover" rule is already in use in Major League Soccer and the Canadian Football League.
 November 29, 2011: The NLL announced several more rule changes for the 2012 season:
 Challenges to on-field calls will be limited to one per team per half
 The maximum length of a stick is reduced from 46 to 42 inches.
 The Philadelphia Wings announced that during the February 12 game against the Buffalo Bandits, the Wings players will wear special jerseys with their Twitter user names instead of their last names. The game-worn jerseys will be auctioned off after the game, with the proceeds going to the American Cancer Society.

Regular season
 January 21, 2012: John Grant, Jr. became the fifth player in NLL history to score 1000 points with an assist on a Derek Hopcroft goal in Colorado's 13-12 overtime win over the Calgary Roughnecks. Grant started the season with 30 points in three games.
 January 26, 2012: Toronto Rock captain Colin Doyle suffered a lower body injury early in the Rock's 13-11 defeat of the Knighthawks. The injury kept him out of the lineup during the Rock's game against the Calgary Roughnecks the next night, ending his consecutive game streak at 188 games. Doyle is now tied with Steve Toll for the NLL record.
 February 13, 2012: The Edmonton Rush traded holdout Athan Iannucci and a second-round draft pick to the Washington Stealth in exchange for Paul Rabil and a first-round pick. Iannucci was acquired from the Philadelphia Wings in the off-season for Brodie Merrill, but never signed with the Rush.
 February 15, 2012: Five members of the Rochester Knighthawks were suspended indefinitely by the league after a "brawl" at a restaurant in Bloomington, Minnesota. Cody Jamieson, Tyler Burton, Sid Smith, Travis Hill, and Jordan Hall were arrested, charged with various misdemeanors, and released. The suspensions were lifted a week later.
 February 17, 2012: Former NLL Goaltender of the Year Anthony Cosmo was traded from the Minnesota Swarm to the Buffalo Bandits for first-round draft picks in both 2013 and 2014. Cosmo was selected by the Swarm in the Boston Blazers dispersal draft but had not played with the Swarm.
 February 22, 2012: The Minnesota Swarm named Associate General Manager Joe Sullivan head coach, replacing Mike Lines. No reason was given for the move.
 March 2, 2012: John Grant, who reached the 1,000-point milestone earlier in the year, scored his 500th career goal in a 16-13 win over the Buffalo Bandits. Grant became only the third player in NLL history to reach 500 goals, the other two being Gary Gait and John Tavares.
 March 10, 2012: Shawn Williams became the sixth player in NLL history, and second this season, to reach the 1,000-point plateau as his Edmonton Rush lost 16-9 to the Calgary Roughnecks. Williams joins NLL legends Gary Gait, John Tavares, Colin Doyle, Josh Sanderson, and Williams' former Knighthawk teammate John Grant, Jr., who reached the milestone in January.
 March 17, 2012: John Tavares scored the game-winning goal in a 13-10 win against the Minnesota Swarm. The goal was Tavares' 1,600th point in his 21-year NLL career.
 April 7, 2012: Dan Dawson recorded his 75th and 76th assists of the year, breaking the single-season assists record of 74 previously held by Dawson and Josh Sanderson.
 April 23, 2012: Garrett Billings recorded his 79th assist, surpassing Dan Dawson for the league lead and setting a new mark for assists in a season.
 April 28, 2012: John Grant set a new single-season scoring record, recording his 116th point with a goal in Colorado's 16–14 loss to the Minnesota Swarm. Grant surpassed the record of 115 points, set by John Tavares in 2001.
 April 28, 2012: Garrett Billings finished the season with 82 assists, setting the new single-season assist record.

Media Coverage

Beginning with the 2012 NLL season, U.S. broadcast rights shifted to CBS Sports Network, which carried eight regular season games, all of them live.

A new weekly one-hour radio show called "Toronto Rock Total Access" about the Toronto Rock began on January 2, 2012 on TSN Radio. Rock Communications and Public Relations Coordinator Mike Hancock hosts the show, which airs at 8pm on Monday nights. The Rock also announced that 11 of their games would be televised on TSN or TSN2.

The Edmonton Rush and Calgary Roughnecks announced on January 19, 2012 that their four "Battle of Alberta" games would be televised on Sportsnet.

All-Star game
The 2012 All-Star Game was held at the First Niagara Center in Buffalo on February 25, 2012. The West came back from a 9-2 deficit in the second quarter to win the game 20-18. The Calgary Roughneck's Geoff Snider was named Game MVP, scoring 4 goals and 2 assists, and winning 22 of 26 faceoffs.

All-Star teams

* - Not playing due to injury
** - Not playing due to holdout status

Awards

Annual

All-Pro teams
First Team
 John Grant, Jr., Colorado
 Garrett Billings, Toronto
 Dan Dawson, Philadelphia
 Andrew Suitor, Minnesota
 Kyle Rubisch, Edmonton
 Mike Poulin, Calgary

Second Team
 John Tavares, Buffalo
 Cody Jamieson, Rochester
 Shawn Evans, Calgary
 Brodie Merrill, Philadelphia
 Jeff Gilbert, Minnesota
 Mike Carnegie, Calgary
 Aaron Bold, Edmonton

All-Rookie team
 Adam Jones, Colorado
 Kevin Crowley, Philadelphia
 Jordan MacIntosh, Minnesota
 Evan Kirk, Minnesota
 Johnny Powless, Rochester
 Stephen Keogh, Rochester

Weekly awards
The NLL gives out awards weekly for the best offensive player, best transition player, best defensive player, and best rookie. The "Best Overall Player" award is no longer being given out.

Monthly awards 
Awards are also given out monthly for the best overall player and best rookie.

Statistics leaders
Bold numbers indicate new single-season records. Italics indicate tied single-season records.

See also
 2012 in sports

References

12
National Lacrosse League